The Dindi (Telugu: డిండి) is a river in Telangana. It is a tributary of the River Krishna, and includes the Dindi Reservoir. Dindi was flows from Nalgonda,Telangana. This river enter into A.P. and enters into Bay of Bengal

References
This project was constructed by Chekkala Pentaiah and chekkala satyanarayna as contractors under Congress government.

Rivers of Telangana
Rivers of India